The Legislative Assembly of Maranhão is the unicameral legislature of the Brazilian state of Maranhão. The assembly, which is seated in the state capital of São Luís, is composed of has 42 state deputies elected by proportional representation.

External links
Legislative Assembly of Maranhão (in Portuguese)

 
Maranhão
Maranhão
Government of Maranhão